NA-194 Larkana-I is a newly created constituency for the National Assembly of Pakistan. It mainly comprises the Ratodero Taluka and some areas of the Larkana Taluka, which includes a portion of the city of Larkana. It was created in the 2018 delimitation after the constituency overlapping between Qambar Shahdadkot District and Larkana District was ended.

Election 2018 

General elections are scheduled to be held on 25 July 2018.

See also
NA-193 Shikarpur-II
NA-195 Larkana-II

References 

Larkana